Melothria is a genus of flowering plants in the family Cucurbitaceae, native to the Americas from the United States to Argentina, and with some introductions in Africa and elsewhere. A number of Old World species formerly in Melothria were reassigned to Cucumis.

Species
Currently accepted species include:

Melothria campestris (Naudin) H.Schaef. & S.S.Renner
Melothria cucumis Vell.
Melothria dulcis Wunderlin
Melothria hirsuta Cogn.
Melothria longituba C.Jeffrey
Melothria pendula L.
Melothria pringlei (S.Watson) Mart.Crov.
Melothria scabra Naudin
Melothria schulziana Mart.Crov.
Melothria sphaerocarpa (Cogn.) H.Schaef. & S.S.Renner
Melothria trilobata Cogn.
Melothria warmingii Cogn.

References

Cucurbitaceae
Cucurbitaceae genera
Taxa named by Carl Linnaeus
Taxa described in 1753